El Alsson British and American International School is a private international school in New Giza, Giza, Egypt that was established in 1982. It offers a British section from Foundation Stage 1 (3 year olds) to GCSE with a sixth form for AS and A-Levels (18 year olds), and an American section from Preschool to Grade 12 with an option of taking Advanced Placement (AP) courses. The school moved to its new campus in New-Giza on a 14 feddan site.

Extracurricular activities

Houses 
The school has a house system consisting of four houses: memphis (blue), Siwa (yellow), Thebes (red), and Memphis (green). For some years the houses in the secondary school were Horus (blue), Sekhmet (yellow), Anubis (black) and Sobek (green) referring to the Egyptian god's. The houses compete in the Annual Alsson Library Quiz, Sports' Day, Rugby matches and football matches and different quizzes.

School council 
The El Alsson School Council represents the student body. The Council is constituted of representatives from every class. The Council is not politically aligned and does not involve itself in the day-to-day running of affairs of the school but are active in organizing charity, bake sales and events.

Facilities 
The school has a library known as the 'Eileen Lucas Library', used for recreational and research purposes and has a media room adjacent to it.

Notable alumni 
 Fadwa El Gallal, journalist
 Omar Samra, adventurer, entrepreneur, and speaker

References 

Schools in Giza
Private schools in Egypt
International schools in Greater Cairo
Educational institutions established in 1982
1982 establishments in Egypt